Two Calves, a Sheep and a Dun Horse by a Ruin is a oil on panel painting by Dirck van den Bergen, previously misattributed to Adriaen van de Velde. It is now in the National Gallery, London.

References

1665 paintings
Dutch Golden Age paintings
Collections of the National Gallery, London
Cattle in art
Horses in art